The 1950 VFL season was the 54th season of the Victorian Football League (VFL), the highest level senior Australian rules football competition in Victoria. The season featured twelve clubs, ran from 22 April until 23 September, and comprised an 18-game home-and-away season followed by a finals series featuring the top four clubs.

The premiership was won by the Essendon Football Club for the tenth time and second time consecutively, after it defeated  by 38 points in the 1950 VFL Grand Final.

Premiership season
In 1950, the VFL competition consisted of twelve teams of 18 on-the-field players each, plus two substitute players, known as the 19th man and the 20th man. A player could be substituted for any reason; however, once substituted, a player could not return to the field of play under any circumstances.

Teams played each other in a home-and-away season of 18 rounds; matches 12 to 18 were the "home-and-way reverse" of matches 1 to 7.

Once the 18 round home-and-away season had finished, the 1950 VFL Premiers were determined by the specific format and conventions of the Page–McIntyre system.

Round 1

|- style="background:#ccf;"
| Home team
| Home team score
| Away team
| Away team score
| Venue
| Crowd
| Date
|- style="background:#fff;"
| 
| 11.8 (74)
| 
| 9.10 (64)
| Arden Street Oval
| 20,000
| 22 April 1950
|- style="background:#fff;"
| 
| 9.20 (74)
| 
| 12.11 (83)
| Western Oval
| 13,500
| 22 April 1950
|- style="background:#fff;"
| 
| 4.15 (39)
| 
| 18.11 (119)
| Glenferrie Oval
| 10,000
| 22 April 1950
|- style="background:#fff;"
| 
| 9.10 (64)
| 
| 9.16 (70)
| Brunswick Street Oval
| 20,000
| 22 April 1950
|- style="background:#fff;"
| 
| 14.12 (96)
| 
| 11.10 (76)
| Lake Oval
| 20,000
| 22 April 1950
|- style="background:#fff;"
| 
| 13.13 (91)
| 
| 10.11 (71)
| MCG
| 33,000
| 22 April 1950

Round 2

|- style="background:#ccf;"
| Home team
| Home team score
| Away team
| Away team score
| Venue
| Crowd
| Date
|- style="background:#fff;"
| 
| 29.7 (181)
| 
| 10.16 (76)
| Windy Hill
| 22,000
| 29 April 1950
|- style="background:#fff;"
| 
| 16.11 (107)
| 
| 9.11 (65)
| Victoria Park
| 22,300
| 29 April 1950
|- style="background:#fff;"
| 
| 18.18 (126)
| 
| 16.14 (110)
| Princes Park
| 30,500
| 29 April 1950
|- style="background:#fff;"
| 
| 10.12 (72)
| 
| 10.13 (73)
| Punt Road Oval
| 25,000
| 29 April 1950
|- style="background:#fff;"
| 
| 20.24 (144)
| 
| 5.5 (35)
| Junction Oval
| 10,000
| 29 April 1950
|- style="background:#fff;"
| 
| 18.17 (125)
| 
| 13.14 (92)
| Kardinia Park
| 20,200
| 29 April 1950

Round 3

|- style="background:#ccf;"
| Home team
| Home team score
| Away team
| Away team score
| Venue
| Crowd
| Date
|- style="background:#fff;"
| 
| 13.24 (102)
| 
| 4.9 (33)
| Western Oval
| 10,000
| 6 May 1950
|- style="background:#fff;"
| 
| 11.15 (81)
| 
| 15.13 (103)
| Lake Oval
| 20,000
| 6 May 1950
|- style="background:#fff;"
| 
| 12.11 (83)
| 
| 7.17 (59)
| Arden Street Oval
| 18,000
| 6 May 1950
|- style="background:#fff;"
| 
| 9.15 (69)
| 
| 8.11 (59)
| Punt Road Oval
| 17,000
| 6 May 1950
|- style="background:#fff;"
| 
| 8.16 (64)
| 
| 18.11 (119)
| Kardinia Park
| 23,000
| 6 May 1950
|- style="background:#fff;"
| 
| 8.22 (70)
| 
| 12.9 (81)
| Victoria Park
| 30,000
| 6 May 1950

Round 4

|- style="background:#ccf;"
| Home team
| Home team score
| Away team
| Away team score
| Venue
| Crowd
| Date
|- style="background:#fff;"
| 
| 16.27 (123)
| 
| 8.9 (57)
| Brunswick Street Oval
| 12,500
| 13 May 1950
|- style="background:#fff;"
| 
| 21.9 (135)
| 
| 9.10 (64)
| Windy Hill
| 18,000
| 13 May 1950
|- style="background:#fff;"
| 
| 17.15 (117)
| 
| 16.10 (106)
| Princes Park
| 29,000
| 13 May 1950
|- style="background:#fff;"
| 
| 12.8 (80)
| 
| 10.18 (78)
| Junction Oval
| 30,000
| 13 May 1950
|- style="background:#fff;"
| 
| 10.7 (67)
| 
| 9.16 (70)
| MCG
| 23,000
| 13 May 1950
|- style="background:#fff;"
| 
| 6.12 (48)
| 
| 7.25 (67)
| Glenferrie Oval
| 9,000
| 13 May 1950

Round 5

|- style="background:#ccf;"
| Home team
| Home team score
| Away team
| Away team score
| Venue
| Crowd
| Date
|- style="background:#fff;"
| 
| 14.12 (96)
| 
| 14.9 (93)
| Arden Street Oval
| 14,000
| 20 May 1950
|- style="background:#fff;"
| 
| 13.11 (89)
| 
| 16.9 (105)
| Western Oval
| 12,500
| 20 May 1950
|- style="background:#fff;"
| 
| 19.15 (129)
| 
| 4.24 (48)
| Brunswick Street Oval
| 8,500
| 20 May 1950
|- style="background:#fff;"
| 
| 10.18 (78)
| 
| 17.8 (110)
| Punt Road Oval
| 33,000
| 20 May 1950
|- style="background:#fff;"
| 
| 10.19 (79)
| 
| 12.8 (80)
| Kardinia Park
| 23,000
| 20 May 1950
|- style="background:#fff;"
| 
| 10.14 (74)
| 
| 8.7 (55)
| Junction Oval
| 47,000
| 20 May 1950

Round 6

|- style="background:#ccf;"
| Home team
| Home team score
| Away team
| Away team score
| Venue
| Crowd
| Date
|- style="background:#fff;"
| 
| 20.15 (135)
| 
| 5.11 (41)
| Kardinia Park
| 24,000
| 27 May 1950
|- style="background:#fff;"
| 
| 14.14 (98)
| 
| 16.11 (107)
| Victoria Park
| 24,000
| 27 May 1950
|- style="background:#fff;"
| 
| 16.13 (109)
| 
| 16.10 (106)
| Princes Park
| 16,500
| 27 May 1950
|- style="background:#fff;"
| 
| 20.14 (134)
| 
| 10.14 (74)
| Lake Oval
| 9,500
| 27 May 1950
|- style="background:#fff;"
| 
| 13.17 (95)
| 
| 6.8 (44)
| MCG
| 21,000
| 27 May 1950
|- style="background:#fff;"
| 
| 13.8 (86)
| 
| 11.5 (71)
| Arden Street Oval
| 25,000
| 27 May 1950

Round 7

|- style="background:#ccf;"
| Home team
| Home team score
| Away team
| Away team score
| Venue
| Crowd
| Date
|- style="background:#fff;"
| 
| 6.12 (48)
| 
| 14.12 (96)
| Glenferrie Oval
| 8,000
| 3 June 1950
|- style="background:#fff;"
| 
| 7.7 (49)
| 
| 13.15 (93)
| Brunswick Street Oval
| 14,000
| 3 June 1950
|- style="background:#fff;"
| 
| 19.13 (127)
| 
| 9.9 (63)
| Windy Hill
| 27,000
| 3 June 1950
|- style="background:#fff;"
| 
| 12.7 (79)
| 
| 9.20 (74)
| Punt Road Oval
| 26,000
| 3 June 1950
|- style="background:#fff;"
| 
| 10.7 (67)
| 
| 19.25 (139)
| Western Oval
| 19,000
| 3 June 1950
|- style="background:#fff;"
| 
| 9.14 (68)
| 
| 11.8 (74)
| Lake Oval
| 22,000
| 3 June 1950

Round 8

|- style="background:#ccf;"
| Home team
| Home team score
| Away team
| Away team score
| Venue
| Crowd
| Date
|- style="background:#fff;"
| 
| 9.7 (61)
| 
| 14.9 (93)
| Glenferrie Oval
| 14,000
| 10 June 1950
|- style="background:#fff;"
| 
| 19.11 (125)
| 
| 9.8 (62)
| Western Oval
| 13,000
| 10 June 1950
|- style="background:#fff;"
| 
| 11.5 (71)
| 
| 10.16 (76)
| Princes Park
| 46,500
| 10 June 1950
|- style="background:#fff;"
| 
| 10.17 (77)
| 
| 8.12 (60)
| Arden Street Oval
| 30,000
| 12 June 1950
|- style="background:#fff;"
| 
| 14.17 (101)
| 
| 14.12 (96)
| Junction Oval
| 22,000
| 12 June 1950
|- style="background:#fff;"
| 
| 16.9 (105)
| 
| 8.11 (59)
| MCG
| 55,000
| 12 June 1950

Round 9

|- style="background:#ccf;"
| Home team
| Home team score
| Away team
| Away team score
| Venue
| Crowd
| Date
|- style="background:#fff;"
| 
| 14.13 (97)
| 
| 10.11 (71)
| Punt Road Oval
| 28,000
| 17 June 1950
|- style="background:#fff;"
| 
| 11.18 (84)
| 
| 6.15 (51)
| Brunswick Street Oval
| 13,000
| 17 June 1950
|- style="background:#fff;"
| 
| 22.15 (147)
| 
| 9.7 (61)
| Windy Hill
| 14,000
| 17 June 1950
|- style="background:#fff;"
| 
| 9.12 (66)
| 
| 14.14 (98)
| Victoria Park
| 24,500
| 17 June 1950
|- style="background:#fff;"
| 
| 8.12 (60)
| 
| 13.16 (94)
| Lake Oval
| 16,000
| 17 June 1950
|- style="background:#fff;"
| 
| 13.20 (98)
| 
| 15.9 (99)
| Kardinia Park
| 23,500
| 17 June 1950

Round 10

|- style="background:#ccf;"
| Home team
| Home team score
| Away team
| Away team score
| Venue
| Crowd
| Date
|- style="background:#fff;"
| 
| 13.12 (90)
| 
| 12.22 (94)
| Western Oval
| 17,300
| 24 June 1950
|- style="background:#fff;"
| 
| 7.11 (53)
| 
| 9.19 (73)
| Brunswick Street Oval
| 12,000
| 24 June 1950
|- style="background:#fff;"
| 
| 15.12 (102)
| 
| 9.14 (68)
| Victoria Park
| 17,500
| 24 June 1950
|- style="background:#fff;"
| 
| 14.17 (101)
| 
| 13.8 (86)
| Lake Oval
| 15,500
| 24 June 1950
|- style="background:#fff;"
| 
| 8.15 (63)
| 
| 10.12 (72)
| MCG
| 55,700
| 24 June 1950
|- style="background:#fff;"
| 
| 16.15 (111)
| 
| 16.20 (116)
| Glenferrie Oval
| 10,000
| 24 June 1950

Round 11

|- style="background:#ccf;"
| Home team
| Home team score
| Away team
| Away team score
| Venue
| Crowd
| Date
|- style="background:#fff;"
| 
| 19.21 (135)
| 
| 8.7 (55)
| Kardinia Park
| 16,500
| 1 July 1950
|- style="background:#fff;"
| 
| 10.13 (73)
| 
| 15.8 (98)
| Princes Park
| 19,000
| 1 July 1950
|- style="background:#fff;"
| 
| 6.17 (53)
| 
| 9.13 (67)
| Junction Oval
| 23,000
| 1 July 1950
|- style="background:#fff;"
| 
| 14.16 (100)
| 
| 2.13 (25)
| Arden Street Oval
| 10,000
| 1 July 1950
|- style="background:#fff;"
| 
| 15.18 (108)
| 
| 8.14 (62)
| Punt Road Oval
| 17,000
| 1 July 1950
|- style="background:#fff;"
| 
| 12.18 (90)
| 
| 6.12 (48)
| Windy Hill
| 22,000
| 1 July 1950

Round 12

|- style="background:#ccf;"
| Home team
| Home team score
| Away team
| Away team score
| Venue
| Crowd
| Date
|- style="background:#fff;"
| 
| 16.15 (111)
| 
| 4.12 (36)
| Kardinia Park
| 13,000
| 8 July 1950
|- style="background:#fff;"
| 
| 12.17 (89)
| 
| 9.7 (61)
| Windy Hill
| 19,000
| 8 July 1950
|- style="background:#fff;"
| 
| 16.21 (117)
| 
| 9.20 (74)
| Victoria Park
| 14,500
| 8 July 1950
|- style="background:#fff;"
| 
| 8.15 (63)
| 
| 10.14 (74)
| Princes Park
| 21,500
| 8 July 1950
|- style="background:#fff;"
| 
| 10.10 (70)
| 
| 8.9 (57)
| Punt Road Oval
| 23,000
| 8 July 1950
|- style="background:#fff;"
| 
| 8.11 (59)
| 
| 11.10 (76)
| Junction Oval
| 14,000
| 8 July 1950

Round 13

|- style="background:#ccf;"
| Home team
| Home team score
| Away team
| Away team score
| Venue
| Crowd
| Date
|- style="background:#fff;"
| 
| 13.16 (94)
| 
| 9.10 (64)
| MCG
| 38,000
| 15 July 1950
|- style="background:#fff;"
| 
| 10.11 (71)
| 
| 12.12 (84)
| Glenferrie Oval
| 9,000
| 15 July 1950
|- style="background:#fff;"
| 
| 11.10 (76)
| 
| 10.19 (79)
| Western Oval
| 16,000
| 15 July 1950
|- style="background:#fff;"
| 
| 8.9 (57)
| 
| 22.17 (149)
| Lake Oval
| 16,000
| 15 July 1950
|- style="background:#fff;"
| 
| 16.12 (108)
| 
| 12.13 (85)
| Brunswick Street Oval
| 17,000
| 15 July 1950
|- style="background:#fff;"
| 
| 12.18 (90)
| 
| 11.14 (80)
| Arden Street Oval
| 25,000
| 15 July 1950

Round 14

|- style="background:#ccf;"
| Home team
| Home team score
| Away team
| Away team score
| Venue
| Crowd
| Date
|- style="background:#fff;"
| 
| 10.18 (78)
| 
| 13.10 (88)
| Junction Oval
| 18,000
| 22 July 1950
|- style="background:#fff;"
| 
| 4.8 (32)
| 
| 7.13 (55)
| MCG
| 34,000
| 22 July 1950
|- style="background:#fff;"
| 
| 6.10 (46)
| 
| 5.6 (36)
| Brunswick Street Oval
| 14,000
| 22 July 1950
|- style="background:#fff;"
| 
| 8.14 (62)
| 
| 6.9 (45)
| Windy Hill
| 18,000
| 22 July 1950
|- style="background:#fff;"
| 
| 12.7 (79)
| 
| 17.14 (116)
| Princes Park
| 30,500
| 29 July 1950
|- style="background:#fff;"
| 
| 11.12 (78)
| 
| 11.14 (80)
| Glenferrie Oval
| 9,000
| 29 July 1950

Round 15

|- style="background:#ccf;"
| Home team
| Home team score
| Away team
| Away team score
| Venue
| Crowd
| Date
|- style="background:#fff;"
| 
| 15.14 (104)
| 
| 7.5 (47)
| Arden Street Oval
| 9,000
| 5 August 1950
|- style="background:#fff;"
| 
| 13.14 (92)
| 
| 9.12 (66)
| Kardinia Park
| 15,500
| 5 August 1950
|- style="background:#fff;"
| 
| 16.21 (117)
| 
| 2.8 (20)
| Victoria Park
| 9,000
| 5 August 1950
|- style="background:#fff;"
| 
| 11.8 (74)
| 
| 11.11 (77)
| Lake Oval
| 9,000
| 5 August 1950
|- style="background:#fff;"
| 
| 10.9 (69)
| 
| 10.11 (71)
| Western Oval
| 13,000
| 5 August 1950
|- style="background:#fff;"
| 
| 14.20 (104)
| 
| 9.16 (70)
| Punt Road Oval
| 18,000
| 5 August 1950

Round 16

|- style="background:#ccf;"
| Home team
| Home team score
| Away team
| Away team score
| Venue
| Crowd
| Date
|- style="background:#fff;"
| 
| 20.15 (135)
| 
| 11.12 (78)
| Windy Hill
| 24,000
| 12 August 1950
|- style="background:#fff;"
| 
| 10.15 (75)
| 
| 11.15 (81)
| Victoria Park
| 26,000
| 12 August 1950
|- style="background:#fff;"
| 
| 12.11 (83)
| 
| 11.17 (83)
| Princes Park
| 10,500
| 12 August 1950
|- style="background:#fff;"
| 
| 13.11 (89)
| 
| 21.14 (140)
| Lake Oval
| 11,000
| 12 August 1950
|- style="background:#fff;"
| 
| 15.11 (101)
| 
| 14.14 (98)
| MCG
| 17,500
| 12 August 1950
|- style="background:#fff;"
| 
| 11.14 (80)
| 
| 23.16 (154)
| Glenferrie Oval
| 7,000
| 12 August 1950

Round 17

|- style="background:#ccf;"
| Home team
| Home team score
| Away team
| Away team score
| Venue
| Crowd
| Date
|- style="background:#fff;"
| 
| 14.10 (94)
| 
| 16.7 (103)
| Glenferrie Oval
| 6,500
| 19 August 1950
|- style="background:#fff;"
| 
| 7.10 (52)
| 
| 6.11 (47)
| Brunswick Street Oval
| 12,500
| 19 August 1950
|- style="background:#fff;"
| 
| 15.12 (102)
| 
| 13.16 (94)
| Windy Hill
| 33,500
| 19 August 1950
|- style="background:#fff;"
| 
| 8.6 (54)
| 
| 6.12 (48)
| Junction Oval
| 12,000
| 19 August 1950
|- style="background:#fff;"
| 
| 15.19 (109)
| 
| 15.10 (100)
| Punt Road Oval
| 16,000
| 19 August 1950
|- style="background:#fff;"
| 
| 13.14 (92)
| 
| 12.7 (79)
| Western Oval
| 10,000
| 19 August 1950

Round 18

|- style="background:#ccf;"
| Home team
| Home team score
| Away team
| Away team score
| Venue
| Crowd
| Date
|- style="background:#fff;"
| 
| 10.14 (74)
| 
| 12.14 (86)
| Kardinia Park
| 22,500
| 26 August 1950
|- style="background:#fff;"
| 
| 9.10 (64)
| 
| 8.14 (62)
| Victoria Park
| 12,000
| 26 August 1950
|- style="background:#fff;"
| 
| 13.4 (82)
| 
| 10.10 (70)
| Princes Park
| 10,000
| 26 August 1950
|- style="background:#fff;"
| 
| 23.18 (156)
| 
| 9.6 (60)
| MCG
| 10,500
| 26 August 1950
|- style="background:#fff;"
| 
| 9.12 (66)
| 
| 13.12 (90)
| Arden Street Oval
| 16,000
| 26 August 1950
|- style="background:#fff;"
| 
| 8.7 (55)
| 
| 21.10 (136)
| Junction Oval
| 27,000
| 26 August 1950

Ladder

Finals

First Semi-Final

Second Semi-Final

Preliminary Final

Grand final

Awards
 The 1950 VFL Premiership team was Essendon.
 The VFL's leading goalkicker was John Coleman of Essendon with 120 goals (including 8 goals in the final series).
 The winner of the 1950 Brownlow Medal was Allan Ruthven of Fitzroy with 21 votes.
 Hawthorn took the "wooden spoon" in 1950.

Notable events
 In the early 1950 pre-season, veteran Collingwood coach Jock McHale announced his retirement after a then-record 714 senior games. Collingwood called for applications for a non-playing coach, and champion ruckman Phonse Kyne immediately announced his retirement and applied for the job. On 13 April, the Thursday before the last pre-season practice match, the Collingwood committee announced that it had appointed the (then) coach of the Collingwood Second Eighteen team, Bervyn Woods as coach, by the casting vote of the President Harry Curtis. The announcement was greeted with anger, because it meant that Kyne would have to go elsewhere to realise his coaching ambitions. At Collingwood's final practice match, the crowd continuously booed and jeered Woods, the members of the Collingwood committee that had voted for him were threatened and abused, and Kyne was carried around the ground on the shoulders of the crowd at the end of the match. The following day, Woods withdrew his application and reverted to coaching the Second Eighteen, and Kyne was appointed coach.  All committee members then resigned their positions, and Curtis did not seek re-election. Former player Syd Coventry was elected the new president, unopposed.
 In Round 2, St Kilda recorded its first win by 100 points or more, defeating Hawthorn 20.24 (144) to 5.5 (35).
 North Melbourne reached the Grand Final for the first time since joining the VFL in 1925.
In Round 9, North Melbourne won for the first time at Victoria Park, after having suffered 23 straight defeats at the ground.
 Essendon won the First Eighteen, Second Eighteen, and Third Eighteen premierships in 1950.

References

 Maplestone, M., Flying Higher: History of the Essendon Football Club 1872–1996, Essendon Football Club, (Melbourne), 1996. 
 Rogers, S. & Brown, A., Every Game Ever Played: VFL/AFL Results 1897–1997 (Sixth Edition), Viking Books, (Ringwood), 1998. 
 Ross, J. (ed), 100 Years of Australian Football 1897–1996: The Complete Story of the AFL, All the Big Stories, All the Great Pictures, All the Champions, Every AFL Season Reported, Viking, (Ringwood), 1996. 
 Strevens, S., Bob Rose: A Dignified Life, Allen & Unwin, (Crows Nest), 2004.

External links
 1950 Season – AFL Tables

Australian Football League seasons
Vfl season